Swabia (Schwabia) is a historical region in Southern Germany.

Swabia, Schwabia, Suebia, Suevia, or variation, may also refer to:

 417 Suevia, a main-belt asteroid
 Alamannia in the early medieval period
 Bavarian Swabia, the administrative region (Regierungsbezirk) of Bavaria
 Suebi, the homeland of the ancient 
 The Kingdom of the Suebi
 The Duchy of Swabia in the high medieval period
 Swabian League of Cities, 14th century
 Swabian League, 15th century
 Swabian Circle, 16th century

See also

Swabian (disambiguation)
Swabians
Swabian German
Swabi, city in Khyber Pakhtunkhwa